Matteo Ricci  (born 27 May 1994) is an Italian professional footballer who plays as an attacking midfielder for Süper Lig club Fatih Karagümrük, on loan from Frosinone. He is the twin brother of fellow footballer Federico Ricci.

Club career
On 31 July 2018, Ricci joined Serie B club Spezia on a permanent basis. His previous club Roma had a buy-back option.

On 30 August 2021, he signed a three-year contract with Frosinone.

On 4 July 2022, Ricci was loaned to Fatih Karagümrük in Turkey with an option to buy.

International career
Ricci was called up to the senior Italy squad in March 2021.

Personal life
On 1 January 2021, he tested positive for COVID-19.

External links

References

1994 births
Living people
Footballers from Rome
Italian footballers
Association football midfielders
Italy youth international footballers
A.S. Roma players
F.C. Grosseto S.S.D. players
A.C. Carpi players
U.S. Pistoiese 1921 players
Pisa S.C. players
A.C. Perugia Calcio players
U.S. Salernitana 1919 players
Spezia Calcio players
Frosinone Calcio players
Fatih Karagümrük S.K. footballers
Serie A players
Serie B players
Serie C players
Italian expatriate footballers
Expatriate footballers in Turkey
Italian expatriate sportspeople in Turkey